Shankar Babaji Patil (1926 - July 30, 1994) was an Indian Marathi writer from Maharashtra, India.

Patil was born in 1926 in Pattan-Kodoli, Hatkangle Tahsil in Kolhapur District. He attended high school in Gadhinglaj and college in Kolhapur to earn his B.A. and B.T. degrees.

He served for some time as a member of Maharashtra state government's committee on high school textbooks and curricula research.

Patil presided over Marathi Sahitya Sammelan at Nanded in 1985.

Literary works

Collections of short stories
 valiv (१९५८) 
 bhetigati (१९६०) 
 abhal (१९६१) 
 dhind(१९६२) 
 uen (१९६३) 
 vavri sheng (१९६३) 
 kulyanchi chavdi (१९६४) 
kandoba (१९७४)
meeting
Khush Kharedi(1984)
Paijj
Pavulvata
पाटलाची चंची

Novel
 टारफुला

Movie scripts
 वादळवाट
 युगे युगे मी वाट पाहिली
 गंगोलण
 भोळी भाबडी
 पाहुणी
  पिंजरा
 भुजंग
  एक गाव बारा भानगडी
 अशीच एक रात्र होती(1971)

Adaption
Shankar Patil's short story Meeting was adapted by Dr. Priyadarshan Manohar as a short play named Meeting. On May 2nd 2015, Kansas based The Big Bang Theater performed the play at Regnier Hall Auditorium at KU Edwards Campus. The play was directed by Dr. Udayan Apte.

Marathi-language writers
1926 births
1994 deaths
People from Kolhapur district
Presidents of the Akhil Bharatiya Marathi Sahitya Sammelan